Antonio Carlos Mendes Thame (13 June 1946 – 28 April 2022) was a Brazilian politician who served as a Deputy.

References

1946 births
2022 deaths
20th-century Brazilian politicians
21st-century Brazilian politicians
Brazilian Social Democracy Party politicians
Members of the Chamber of Deputies (Brazil) from São Paulo
Mayors of places in Brazil
University of São Paulo alumni
Academic staff of the University of São Paulo
People from Piracicaba